A barman or bartender is someone who serves beverages behind a bar.

Barman may also refer to:

Barman (surname)
Barman (Madhya Pradesh), India
, a tugboat

See also
Barmen (disambiguation)